Jack Palazzolo (born 29 April 2000), is an Australian  footballer who plays as a forward for Box Hill United. On 23 April 2019, he made his professional debut against Guangzhou Evergrande in the 2019 AFC Champions League.

References

External links

2000 births
Living people
Australian soccer players
Association football forwards
Melbourne Victory FC players
National Premier Leagues players